Snow Knight (28 February 1971 – 15 September 1992) was a Thoroughbred racehorse who won Britain's most prestigious race in 1974, the Derby, then the following year earned an Eclipse Award as the American Champion Male Turf Horse.

Background 
Snow Knight was bred by J. A. Claude Lilley, a textile manufacturer and the proprietor of Quarry Stud on Duffield Bank in Makeney, Derbyshire. Lilley had owned and raced Pretendre, sire of the 1971 Kentucky Derby and Preakness Stakes winner, Canonero II. Snow Knight's dam was Snow Blossom, a daughter of Flush Royal, winner of England's Great Yorkshire Stakes and the Prix Noailles in France. His sire was the speedy runner Firestreak who had been owned by Canadian lawyer Neil F. Phillips, whose wife Sharon purchased Snow Knight at auction as a yearling for £5,200.

Racing career

Europe 
Trained by Peter Nelson, at the age of two Snow Knight made five starts, winning two and finishing second twice. At three, in the trial races for the Derby, he finished second in the Ladbrokes Classic Trial Stakes at Sandown Park and third in the Lingfield Derby Trial.

Small injuries slowed him but he would fight back. Always a fractious colt, in the paddock at Epsom Downs Racecourse, Snow Knight threw jockey Brian Taylor and at the starting gate was still fighting his handlers. Sent off at odds of 50:1, he ran in the middle of the pack until the field made the turn at Tattenham Corner, when he sped to the lead and won by two lengths.

North America 
In the fall of 1974, Snow Knight was sold for a reported C$1 million to Canada's leading horseman, E. P. Taylor, and sent to Taylor's Windfields Farm in Ontario. For new trainer Jim Bentley, Snow Knight made three starts at Toronto's Woodbine Racetrack but performed poorly. For the 1975 racing season, Snow Knight was sent to race in the United States, where MacKenzie Miller was entrusted with his race conditioning. Miller, known for his patience, spent months working with the high-strung colt. His diligence paid off when Snow Knight won the important Manhattan Handicap and Man o' War Stakes. Sent back to Woodbine Racetrack for the prestigious Canadian International Championship, he defeated an international field on the turf.

Honours and awards 
On 23 January 1977, Snow Knight was elected to the Aiken Thoroughbred Racing Hall of Fame. He was voted American Champion Male Turf Horse in the Eclipse Awards for 1975.

Retired to stud duty at Windfields Farm, in 1986 Snow Knight was sent to stand in Australia and Died on 15 September 1992.  Although he met with limited success as a sire, Snow Knight did sire the outstanding racemare Awaasif who won the Yorkshire Oaks and the Gran Premio del Jockey Club and finished third in the 1982 Prix de l'Arc de Triomphe.

Pedigree

References 

 Reeves, Richard Stone, Bowen, Edward L. Belmont Park: A Century of Champions (Snow Knight section) (2005) Eclipse Press 

1971 racehorse births
1992 racehorse deaths
Racehorses bred in the United Kingdom
Racehorses trained in the United Kingdom
Eclipse Award winners
Thoroughbred family 6-e
Racehorses trained in Canada
Racehorses trained in the United States
Epsom Derby winners